The 1992–93 International Hockey League season was the first season of the International Hockey League, the top level of ice hockey in Russia. 24 teams participated in the league, and Dynamo Moscow won the championship by defeating Lada Togliatti in the final.

First round

Group 1

Group 2

Group 3

Group 4

Second round

Western Conference

Eastern Conference

Playoffs

External links
Season on hockeyarchives.ru

1992–93 in Russian ice hockey leagues
International Hockey League (1992–1996) seasons